Schuurman and Schuurmans are Dutch toponymic surnames meaning "man from the barn". It can refer to:

Schuurman
 (1904–1998), Dutch church music composer
Betty Schuurman (b. 1962), Dutch actress
Birgit Schuurman (b. 1977), Dutch rock singer and actress
Carol Schuurman (1934–2009), Dutch footballer
Egbert Schuurman (b. 1937), Dutch philosopher and politician
Glenn Schuurman (b. 1991), Dutch field hockey player
Jari Schuurman (b. 1997), Dutch footballer
Katja Schuurman (b. 1975), Dutch actress and singer
Marriët Schuurman (b. 1969), Dutch diplomat
Petra Schuurman (b. 1968), Dutch chess master
Renée Schuurman (1939–2001), South African tennis player 
Resit Schuurman (b. 1979), Dutch footballer
Steven Schuurman (born 1975), Dutch technology and media entrepreneur
Tollien Schuurman (1913–1994), Dutch sprinter, world-record holder on the 100m and 200m dash in the 1930s
Wil Schuurman (b. 1943), Dutch politician

Schuurmans
Daan Schuurmans (b. 1972), Dutch actor
Jared Schuurmans (b. 1987), American track and field athlete

See also
Schuerman
Schurman

External links
 Schuurman at the Dutch surname database

Dutch-language surnames